John William Powell (March 4, 1928 - November 15, 2010) was an American farmer and Democratic politician. He was a member of the Mississippi State Senate from 1960 to 1988.

Biography 
John William Powell was born on March 4, 1928, in Liberty, Mississippi. He graduated from Liberty High School and Southwest Mississippi Junior College. He began serving as a Democrat in the Mississippi State Senate in 1960. He continued serving in the Senate until he retired in 1988. He died on November 15, 2010, in McComb, Mississippi.

References 

1928 births
2010 deaths
People from Liberty, Mississippi
Democratic Party Mississippi state senators